Lokomotiv Stadium (Tavriya) is a multi-purpose stadium in Simferopol, . It is currently used mostly for football matches, and is the home of FC TSK Simferopol, and formerly SC Tavriya Simferopol. The stadium holds 19,978 people and was built in 1967 and renovated in 2004.

The stadium hosted a friendly between the USSR and Bulgaria in 1979. Remarkably, the stadium was the base stadium during UEFA Euro 1988 qualifying for the USSR. The stadium hosted two of the four home games of the qualifying campaign with matches against the national teams of Norway and Iceland. Both games gathered crowds of more than 30,000 people. One other game was played in Kiev and the other one in Moscow. Later, on 15 November 1989, the stadium also hosted a game of the 1990 FIFA World Cup qualification against the national team of Turkey.

The stadium was one of three Ukrainian-based home stadiums for the USSR. The other stadiums used were Republican stadium in Kiev (12 matches) and Central Stadium of the Black Sea Shipping Company in Odessa (one match).

Soviet national team results in Simferopol

References 

Buildings and structures in Simferopol
Football venues in Crimea
Multi-purpose stadiums in Ukraine
Buildings and structures completed in 1967
Sports venues built in the Soviet Union
Sports venues completed in 1967
Sport in Simferopol
SC Tavriya Simferopol
Sports venues in Crimea